David B. Robbins (born October 21, 1959) is an American lawyer, hedge fund manager, and private equity investor. He was formerly the chairman of Bally Technologies until its sale to Scientific Games in 2014 and currently serves as a managing partner in various investment partnerships, including Relativity Media, UltraV Holdings, Alexiam Capital, and Trevi Health Capital.

Life and career 

A native of Long Island, New York, Robbins received his BS in Economics from the Wharton School of the University of Pennsylvania in 1981 and his JD from the NYU School of Law in 1984.

Following a 15-year career as a corporate attorney, Robbins has founded and managed multiple private equity and growth capital funds, investing in media and entertainment, gaming, healthcare, and life sciences.

In 2005, Robbins co-founded Trevi Health Capital, a healthcare-focused private equity firm, with an emphasis on healthcare information technology, healthcare services, and medical technology.

He served as chairman of Bally Technologies (NYSE:BYI), a publicly traded gaming equipment and technology company from 1996 until its sale to Scientific Games (NASDAQ:SGMS) in 2014.

In 2016, Robbins was appointed to Sears Hometown and Outlet Stores (NASDAQ:SHOS) board of directors.

In 2018, Robbins acquired Relativity Media, a film and television distribution and production company, through UltraV holdings, a partnership between Robbins and SoundPoint Capital.

Robbins has invested as a producer in multiple Broadway productions, most notably, Pippin, for which he received a Tony Award for Best Revival of a Musical in 2013.

Civic engagement 
Robbins’s family foundation focuses on medical research, with an emphasis in neurology, sponsoring research programs at the Columbia University Institute for Genomic Medicine and NYU Langone Medical Center.

Robbins is an active supporter at NYU FACES (Finding a Cure for Epilepsy and Seizures) and serves on the board of trustees for the McCarton Center (addressing autism and developmental disabilities), the steering committee for the NYU Langone Comprehensive Epilepsy Center, and Columbia University’s Precision Medicine Council.

References 

Living people
1959 births
American chief executives
American financial businesspeople
American investors
American money managers
Businesspeople from New York City
Jewish American philanthropists
People from Long Island
Wharton School of the University of Pennsylvania alumni
Philanthropists from New York (state)
New York University School of Law alumni
American film producers
Film producers from California
21st-century American Jews